Matej Ferjan (5 January 1977 – 22 May 2011) was a Slovenian motorcycle speedway rider who also rode for the Hungary national speedway team.

Career
Ferjan was born in Ljubljana, Slovenia.  He was a five-time Slovenian Individual Speedway Championship winner (1997, 1998, 1999, 2000, 2001) and a six-time Hungarian champion (2003, 2004, 2006, 2007, 2008, 2009). 

In 1998, he won a third place in Individual U-21 World Championship. In 2004, he was second in the Individual European Championship. On 9 July 2000 he won the Continental Final, which formed part of the 2001 Speedway Grand Prix Qualification. He then secured a permanent ride in the 2001 and 2002 Speedway Grand Prixs. He was also the first non Polish rider to win the Polish Criterium of Aces, winning in 2007.

Death
On 22 May 2011 Ferjan was found dead in his van at the apartment block where he lived in Gorzów Wielkopolski, Poland. His cause of death has been attributed to a blood clot in his leg.

Family
Ferjan had a son, Mark, born on 19 April 2004, and a daughter, Victoria.

See also 
 Slovenia national speedway team
 Hungary national speedway team
 List of Speedway Grand Prix riders

References 

1977 births
2011 deaths
Sportspeople from Ljubljana
Slovenian speedway riders
Hungarian speedway riders
Belle Vue Aces riders
Peterborough Panthers riders
Poole Pirates riders
Oxford Cheetahs riders